Solo Electric Bass 1 is a live album by Squarepusher. The album consists of twelve tracks recorded from Squarepusher's September 2007 live performance at Cité de la Musique in Paris, France, as part of the Jazz à la Villette 2007 festival. In contrast to Squarepusher's  multi-instrumental performances, the tracks on Solo Electric Bass 1 were performed using only a 6-string electric extended-range bass guitar and amplifier. The release is limited to 850 copies worldwide.

Track listing

References 
Sources
 http://warp.net/records/squarepusher/new-limited-album-solo-electric-bass-1 
 http://warp.net/records/releases/squarepusher/solo-electric-bass-1 

Notes

External links

2009 live albums
Squarepusher live albums
Warp (record label) live albums